Himilo Qaran is a Somali political party founded in December 2018.  The party has been formed ahead of the 2021 Somali elections. It is led by Sharif Sheikh Ahmed. 

In October 2019 Himilo Qaran joined the Forum for National Parties, an alliance of Somali political parties led by former President Sharif Sheikh Ahmed.

References

External links
 
 Official Twitter account
 Himilo Qaran on Facebook

Political parties in Somalia
Islamic political parties in Somalia
Islamic democratic political parties